Events from the year 1711 in Denmark.

Incumbents
 Monarch – Frederick IV
 Grand Chancellor – Christian Christophersen Sehested

Events
 January  An outbreak of plaque his Helsingør.
 May 25 – Helsingør is put under military blockade to prevent an outbreak of plague from spreading to Copenhagen. A total of 1,809, about one third of Helsingør's population, are killed by the disease in 1711. The efforts to keep the disease from spreading fail and a total of 40,000 people in Copenhagen and northern Zealand are killed by the disease during the outbreak. The blockade of Helsingør is not lifted until 25 July 1712.

Undated
 The short-lived County of Friderichsholm is established by Frederick IV for his mistress Charlotte Helene von Schindel from the manors of  Næsbyholm and  Bavelse but dissolved again in 1716.

Births
 7 April – Daniel Ernst Bille, naval officer (died 1790)
 November – Marcus Fredrik Bang, bishop (died 1789)

Date unknown
 Utilia Lenkiewitz, actress (died 1770)

Deaths
 17 May – Johann Gottfried Becker, pharmacist (born 1639)

Date unknown
Cille Gad, poet and culture personality (born 1675)

References

 
1710s in Denmark
Denmark
Years of the 18th century in Denmark